Adrian Pradhan (born August 18) is a Nepalese vocalist, composer and songwriter of Nepali music. He was born and raised in Kalimpong, India. He is the lead member of the Nepali rock band 1974 AD. Pradhan was the lead vocalist of the band until March 2015, after which he was replaced by Rohit John Chhetri. Pradhan reunited with the band in 2019 and has been associated with 1974 AD since.

Early life
Pradhan's musical journey started during his school years at St. Augustine's School, Kalimpong, where he was a member of the school choir. The mouth organ and keyboard were his first instruments and he picked up the guitar in the year 1989 and switched to drums in the year 1995. His first band was Eurika where the foundation of a musical career was laid. Later he was involved with the band Flames which toured India and was featured in the Sun Magazine (Indian Edition).

With 1974 AD
Pradhan joined 1974 AD in 1994 as a pianist. Along with fellow band-member Phiroj Shyangden, he was the front man of the band and did the vocals, played the drums and harmonica.

The Original Duo 
In 2016 Pradhan reunited once again with former 1974 AD band member Phiroj Shyangden under the name 'The Original Duo'. They toured five states in USA in 2016. alongside Nepal, UK, and Australia in 2017-18.

Albums
Adrian Pradhan discography (solo)

Adrian Pradhan discography (with 1974 AD)

See also 
 Navneet Aditya Waiba
 Phiroj Shyangden
 1974 AD

References

External links 
 Pradhan's YouTube channel
 Pradhan's Facebook Page
 Official website

Year of birth missing (living people)
Living people
Indian male singers
Indian musicians
People from Kalimpong district